Gysbert Johannes Muller, more commonly known as Johann Muller (born 6 January 1980 in Mossel Bay, South Africa), is a South African former rugby union player.

Career
Muller made his debut for the Springboks against Scotland in 2006 at ABSA Stadium. He would then earn a further 5 caps, 4 of which being as a member of the starting 15. Muller made his provincial debut in 2001 and his Super 14 debut the following year. Muller was selected into the Springboks squad for the 2007 home tests and the 2007 Tri Nations on the basis of a strong 2007 Super 14 performance.

2007 Tri Nations 
During the latter part of the competition, Springbok coach Jake White decided to rest his top players from touring Australia and New Zealand. White stated that the players that were taken on this tour would be playing for places in the Springboks 2007 Rugby World Cup squad. Muller was included in the squad chosen to tour.

He was named captain in the match against the All Blacks on 14 July 2007 after original tour captain Bob Skinstad was injured in the match against the Wallabies. Muller performed well in both matches. He was then rewarded with a place in the squad for the 2007 Rugby World Cup.

Ulster Rugby
Johann Muller joined Ulster Rugby in 2010, where his solid performances saw him selected as the captain of the team. Though his regular game-time was diminishing due to the more regular onset of injury, he brought to the table his organisation skills and leadership. On 7 February 2014, it was announced that Johann Muller would retire at the end of the season.

References

External links

Sharks profile

1980 births
Living people
People from Mossel Bay
Afrikaner people
South African people of German descent
Rugby union locks
South African rugby union players
South Africa international rugby union players
Sharks (Currie Cup) players
Sharks (rugby union) players
Rugby union players from the Western Cape
Ulster Rugby players
South African expatriate sportspeople in Northern Ireland
Expatriate rugby union players in Northern Ireland
South African expatriate rugby union players